Peter Reichensperger (b. at Coblenz, 28 May 1810 - d. at Berlin, 31 December 1892) was a German jurist and parliamentarian for Centre Party.

Life

He studied at Bonn and Heidelberg, and was successively counsellor at Coblenz (1843), of the court of appeal at Cologne (1850), and of the supreme court of Berlin (1859) until its dissolution (1879). From 1848 he was active as a parliamentarian in the Prussian Diet, the Erfurt Volkshaus, the Prussian second chamber (1849), the constituent North-German Reichstag (1857), the Customs' Parliament (1868), and the German Reichstag, representing in the last-mentioned the same district from 1871 to his death.

He worked closely with his elder brother August Reichensperger, and, like the latter, he defended the Rhenish system of laws against the minister von Kamptz ("Oeffentlichkeit, Mündlichkeit und Schwurgerichte", 1834). Like his brother he collaborated with the author in de Failly's much-discussed book (De la Prusse, 1842), and they jointly drew up a petition for electoral reform (1847). In the same year was published one of his best works: Die Agrarfrage aus dem Gesichtspunkt der Nationalökonomie, der Politik und des Rechts.

In 1858, when a collection of their parliamentary speeches appeared, the brothers published their political programme in the pamphlet Die Wahlen zum preussischen Abgeordnetenhause, and two years later Deutschlands nächste Aufgaben für die Zukunft. They defended constitutional monarchy and religious autonomy. Less versatile than his brother, Peter surpassed him in juristic keenness and intellectual depth.

In special writings he combatted the income tax (1850), the abolition of the usury laws (1860), and the corn tax (1887). At the request of the ministry of justice he drafted a mortgage law (1851). Five years later he wrote on free agricultural laws, in 1872 on the relation between Church and State, in 1876 on the peace between Church and State. In 1882 appeared his experiences of an old parliamentarian in the revolutionary year 1848. Though co-founder and leader of the Centre, he followed in many individual questions his own views, e.g. in the extension of the socialist law and in the question of the septennate.

References
 which in turn cites:
Gorres in Staatslexikon der Gorresgesellschaft (3rd ed., 1911)

External links
 

1810 births
1892 deaths
Jurists from Rhineland-Palatinate
German Roman Catholics
Members of the Reichstag of the German Empire
Members of the 1st Reichstag of the German Empire
Members of the 2nd Reichstag of the German Empire
Members of the 3rd Reichstag of the German Empire
Members of the 4th Reichstag of the German Empire
Members of the 5th Reichstag of the German Empire
Members of the 6th Reichstag of the German Empire
Members of the 7th Reichstag of the German Empire
Members of the 8th Reichstag of the German Empire
Politicians from Koblenz
Member of the Prussian National Assembly
Centre Party (Germany) politicians